The badminton tournaments at the 2012 Olympic Games in London took place between 28 July and 5 August at Wembley Arena.

A total of 172 athletes competed in five events: men's singles, women's singles, men's doubles, women's doubles and mixed doubles. The women's doubles tournament was marred by several disqualifications during the group stage for unethical play.

All of the gold medals were won by players from China. The Chinese team also collected two silvers and one bronze, to top the medal table with eight in total. Denmark finished in second place, with one silver and one bronze won.

Competition format
For the first time there was a combination of group play and knockout stages in the Olympic badminton tournament, following its introduction at the 2010 Youth Summer Olympics in Singapore.

All matches were the best of three games, with each game won by the first player to reach 21 points. If the score reached 20–20, the winner was the first player to lead by two points. If the score reached 29–29, the player who won the next point won the match.

The draw for the groups was held on 23 July 2012.

Qualification

The Olympic qualification period was between 2 May 2011 and 29 April 2012, and the Badminton World Federation rankings list, published on 3 May 2012, was used to allocate spots. Nations could enter a maximum of three players. Three quota places if three players are ranked four or above, two if two players are ranked 16 or above and otherwise one quota place until the quota contingent of 38 is filled.

For each male player who qualifies in more than one discipline, an additional quota place in the men's singles becomes free. If no player from one continent can qualify, the best ranked player from this continent gets a quota place.

Competition schedule

Women's doubles disqualifications

On 1 August 2012, four teams were ejected from the competition (Wang Xiaoli and Yu Yang of China, Jung Kyung-eun and Kim Ha-na with Ha Jung-eun and Kim Min-jung, both playing for South Korea, and Meiliana Jauhari and Greysia Polii of Indonesia) for "not using one's best efforts to win a match" and "conducting oneself in a manner that is clearly abusive or detrimental to the sport" following round-robin matches the previous evening, during which the teams were accused of trying to lose in order to manipulate the draw.

Participation
A total of 172 badminton players from 51 Olympic Committees (NOCs) from the five Continental Confederations will participate at the 2012 Summer Olympics.

Participating nations
Below is the list of NOCs participants in badminton competition at the 2012 Summer Olympics.

 Host

Medal summary

Medal table

Medalists

Results

Men's singles

Women's singles

Men's doubles

Women's doubles

Mixed doubles

References

External links 

 
 
 

 
2012 Summer Olympics events
2012
Olympics